Sandy Springs is a city in northern Fulton County, Georgia, United States, and an inner ring suburb of Atlanta. The city's population was 108,080 at the 2020 census, making it Georgia's seventh-largest city. It is the site of several corporate headquarters, including UPS, Newell Brands, Inspire Brands, Focus Brands, Cox Enterprises, and Mercedes-Benz USA's corporate offices.

History

Human settlement in the area can be traced back to approximately 400 CE, when Native Americans forged three trails to better access the area's freshwater springs. In the 16th century, the Creek Muskogee tribe settled the area, where they remained until the early 1800s, when they were forced out of the area due to the discovery of gold.

In 1821, the federal government held a number of land lotteries in the area, resulting in the purchase of land in present-day Sandy Springs and its subsequent settlement. The Austin-Johnson House, the oldest existing unaltered house, was built in 1842 on what is now Johnson Ferry Road. In 1851, Wilson Spruill donated  of land for the founding of Sandy Springs United Methodist Church, near the natural spring for which the city is named. In 1905, the Hammond School was built at Johnson Ferry Road and Mt. Vernon Highway, across the street from the church.

20th century 

In 1950, the state legislature blocked Atlanta from annexing the community, which remained rural until the Interstate Highway System was authorized by the Federal-Aid Highway Act of 1956. In 1959, after a fire at Hammond Elementary School, William Hartsfield, the mayor of Atlanta, urged residents to support annexation so that the area would have better firefighting protection. Community opposition killed the proposal. In the early 1960s, Georgia 400 and Interstate 285 were constructed, connecting Sandy Springs to metro Atlanta and initiating a housing boom that brought new residents and major land development as part of the white flight from Atlanta after the Civil Rights Movement won greater racial integration within Atlanta. 

In 1965, Hartsfield once again proposed the annexation of the Sandy Springs area. Spokesmen for Sandy Springs promised residents to "build up a city separate from Atlanta and your Negroes and forbid any Negroes to buy, or own, or live within our limits" should they reject annexation. In 1966, annexation by Atlanta was defeated in a referendum, with two-thirds voting against.

Efforts to incorporate Sandy Springs began in 1966 in response to attempts by the city of Atlanta to annex this unincorporated area of north Fulton County. 

In the early 1970s, the city of Atlanta attempted to use a state law to force annexation of Sandy Springs, which failed after the Supreme Court of Georgia ruled that the law was unconstitutional. In response, a group of residents formed the Committee for Sandy Springs 1975 to lobby for the incorporation of Sandy Springs. 

During this time, proponents for an incorporated Sandy Springs argued that their taxes were disproportionately going to other, largely non-white, communities in Fulton County. In every legislative session, state legislators representing the area introduced a bill in the Georgia General Assembly to authorize a referendum on incorporation. Legislators representing Atlanta and southwestern Fulton County, who feared that tax revenue would be lost from incorporation, blocked the bills, using the procedural requirement that all local legislation be approved first by a delegation of representatives from the affected area.

In 1991, the Georgia state government determined that Sandy Springs, along with other wealthier, and predominantly white, communities in Fulton County was being taxed below statewide minimums, resulting in an increase in taxes for the area. Some Sandy Springs residents, including Mitch Skandalakis, launched a number of campaigns against the taxes, and launched an unsuccessful lawsuit against the state.

On January 16, 1997, Eric Rudolph bombed an abortion clinic in Sandy Springs.

21st century 

When the Republican Party gained a majority in both houses of the Georgia General Assembly in 2005, the procedural rules previously used to prevent a vote by the full chamber were changed so that the bill was handled as a state bill and not as a local bill. The assembly also repealed the requirement that new cities must be at least  from existing cities that had stymied previous attempts to incorporate due to Sandy Springs directly bordering both Roswell and Atlanta. The bill allowing for a referendum on incorporation was introduced and passed as HB 37. The referendum initiative was approved by the Assembly and signed by Governor Sonny Perdue.

The referendum was held on June 21, 2005, and residents voted 94% in favor of incorporation. In November 2005, voters returned to the polls to elect a mayor and six city council members. 

Formal incorporation occurred on December 1, making Sandy Springs the third-largest city ever to incorporate in the U.S. The city's police force and fire department began service in 2006. Upon incorporation, Sandy Springs initiated a nontraditional approach by operating as a public-private partnership (PPP), with all but six full-time employees being contracted.

In 2010, the city undertook a procurement process to rebid all general city services, which was won by CH2M Hill. The timing of this contract, during the Great Recession, allowed the city to leverage a cheaper contract due to the economic downturn.

In 2010, the city became the first jurisdiction in Georgia to successfully "bail out" from the preclearance requirements of Section 5 of the Voting Rights Act.

In 2019, the Sandy Springs City Council moved to scale back the PPP model, directly hiring 183 contract employees, leaving only 15 outsourced full-time workers by the end of 2019. The city will still outsource a number of services, including the city attorney's office, as well as security, street sweeping and ambulance services. The move is expected to save $2.7 million in the next year and more than $14 million over 5 years.

Geography
The boundaries of Sandy Springs are Atlanta to the south, Cobb County (at the Chattahoochee River) to the west and north, Roswell (also at the river) to the north, and Dunwoody and Brookhaven, at the DeKalb County line, to the east. A small panhandle in the northeast extends between the Chattahoochee River to the north and Dunwoody to the south, ending in a very small border with Peachtree Corners in the extreme western edge of Gwinnett County.

Climate
Sandy Springs has a humid subtropical climate (Köppen climate classification Cfa). During January and February 2014, the Atlanta area, including Sandy Springs, experienced a severe snow storm and a severe ice storm, both of which left much of the region without power, caused major travel disruptions, and the former storm forced people to take shelter in cars and schools as the city was underprepared for the black ice that prevented transport.

Neighborhoods

Downtown - City Springs
City Springs, the downtown district of Sandy Springs, is usually defined as the area to the south and east of Sandy Springs Circle, to the north of Interstate 285, and to the west of Boylston Drive. It is located approximately 12 miles directly north of Downtown Atlanta. In the absence of a traditional downtown, city leaders created City Springs, a multi-use development containing municipal offices, residential, retail, green space and a performing arts center, landmarking a formal "downtown" for its residents. City leaders purchased the property in 2008, which was once the site of a former Target (formerly Richway) shopping center, located between Roswell Road, Johnson Ferry Road, and Mount Vernon Highway. Since then, the surrounding area in the district has become a center for urban renewal for the city, with many new mixed-use apartment developments being planned or built, primarily replacing old strip malls along Roswell Road. The City Springs center officially opened in 2018, 10 years after the original site purchase. The official address for the complex is on Galambos Way, named after the city's first mayor, Eva Galambos. Within the City Springs district is Heritage Green, which is home to the spring which spurred the name of the city.

Riverside 
Riverside is the western district of the city, located south of Dalyrmple Road and west of Roswell Road, bordering the Chattahoochee River to the west, forming the western border with Cobb County. It is a high-income, residential area marked by winding, hilly roads and old growth forest. The main roads are Heards Ferry Road and Riverside Drive, and it is located off the Riverside Drive exit of I-285. Two of the public schools within Sandy Springs are located here, Heards Ferry Elementary and Riverwood International Charter School. The headquarters for the Fulton County Board of Education are also found in this district. Many of the neighborhoods in this area derive their name from the river.

The Panhandle 
The Dunwoody Panhandle, or just "The Panhandle" is a residential area bounded by the Dunwoody city limit to the south, the Chattahoochee River to the north, Georgia 400 to the west, and Peachtree Corners city limit to the east. The district's name is derived from the fact that it is wedged between the river and Dunwoody, forming a geographic panhandle. Major roads include Dunwoody Club Drive and Spalding Drive, and Interstate access is through the Northridge Road exit of Georgia 400. Many who lived in the neighborhood during Sandy Springs' incorporation considered themselves part of Dunwoody, and voiced their opposition to the installment of street sign toppers labelled "Sandy Springs". Then-mayor Eva Galambos stated that these new signs would do nothing to diminish the neighborhood's identity. Some residents still consider the area to be "Dunwoody in Sandy Springs", similar to the Buckhead Community district of Atlanta.

Perimeter Center 
Perimeter Center is a commercial edge city and business district surrounding Perimeter Mall. Although about 40% of Perimeter Center, including the mall, is located in Dunwoody, the western 60%, including most of the area's office towers, are located in Sandy Springs. Pill Hill is located in the Sandy Springs section of Perimeter Center, and is the largest medical center in Georgia. It includes Northside Hospital, St. Joseph's Hospital, and Children's Healthcare of Atlanta. More than 40% of the hospital beds in the metro area are located within Sandy Springs. Landmarks include Hammond Park, Concourse at Landmark Center, colloquially called the ‘King’ and ‘Queen’ buildings due to their distinct white crown architecture at the top of each tower, as well as two MARTA stations, the Sandy Springs and Medical Center MARTA stations. The area also includes the 400-285 highway interchange, which is currently undergoing major construction. The top three tallest suburban buildings in the country are found here, the ‘King’ and ‘Queen’, and nearby Park Towers at #3.

North Springs 
North Springs is located in the northern portion of the city, and is generally defined as the area west of the Dunwoody/DeKalb County border, east of Brandon Mill Road, north of Abernathy Road, and south of Dalrymple Road and Spalding Drive. The North Springs MARTA station, the terminus of the MARTA Red Line, serves the district. Five of Sandy Springs’ public schools are in this area, including the newest Ison Springs Elementary School, Woodland Elementary School, Spalding Drive Charter Elementary School, Sandy Springs Charter Middle School, and North Springs Charter High School.

South Springs - Sandy Springs ITP 
South Springs or Sandy Springs ITP, an acronym for "inside the perimeter", refers to a portion of the city which extends south of Interstate 285, colloquially referred to as "the perimeter". It is located north of the City of Atlanta border, east of the Riverside district, south of Interstate 285, and west of the Brookhaven/DeKalb County border. The southern area of this district is considered to be a part of the greater Chastain Park community of Buckhead. The public schools in this area include Ridgeview Charter School and High Point Elementary School. The popular Atlanta radio station 99X broadcasts on 98.9 from here.

Powers Ferry Landing 
The business district just east of the river crossing is called Powers Ferry Landing, located where Northside Drive crosses the road, just east of the former landing. This provides freeway access at Northside Drive (west ramps) and New Northside Drive (east ramps, road and ramps built in a 1990s reconstruction). Signage on the freeway indicates Powers Ferry Road, Northside Drive, and New Northside Drive.

North End
The North End is a large district in the northernmost portion of the city, and is generally defined as the area to the west of GA400, to the south and east of the Chattahoochee River, and to the north of Dalrymple Road. It is accessible via GA400 at Northridge Road, and contains the Northridge business area and the North River Village community. The Huntcliff community is located west of the district, on a panhandle to the northwest.

Demographics

(Note: the 2000 census numbers are for Sandy Springs prior to incorporation, but cover the same area.)

2020 census

As of the 2020 United States census, there were 108,080 people, 52,820 households, and 25,861 families residing in the city.

2010 census
In the official 2010 census, the population of Sandy Springs was 93,853. There were 42,334 households. The racial and ethnic composition of the population was 65.0% white, 20.0% black or African American, 0.3% Native American, 5.0% Asian, 6.9% from some other race and 2.7% from two or more races. 14.2% of the population was Hispanic or Latino of any race.

2000 census
The racial makeup of the CDP was 77.55% White, 12.04% African American, 0.18% Native American, 3.29% Asian, 0.05% Pacific Islander, 4.94% from other races, and 1.95% from two or more races. Hispanic or Latino of any race were 9.93% of the population. According to a 2006 report by the Atlanta Jewish Federation, 15,300 Jews reside in Sandy Springs and the adjacent city of Dunwoody.

There were 48,288 households, out of which 21.1% had children under the age of 18 living with them, 40.1% were married couples living together, 7.0% had a female householder with no husband present, and 49.9% were non-families. 35.9% of all households were made up of individuals, and 6.8% had someone living alone who was 65 years of age or older. The average household size was 2.17 and the average family size was 2.87.

In the CDP, the age distribution of the population shows 17.8% under the age of 18, 10.5% from 18 to 24, 40.3% from 25 to 44, 21.6% from 45 to 64, and 9.8% who were 65 years of age or older. The median age was 33 years. For every 100 females, there were 96.6 males. For every 100 females age 18 and over, there were 95.0 males.

According to a 2008 estimate, the median income for a household in the city was $106,240, and the median income for a family was $129,810. The average income for a household was $116,406 and the average income for a family was $169,815. Males had a median income of $60,053 versus $50,030 for females. About 3.1% of families and 7.9% of the population were below the poverty line, including 8.9% of those under age 18 and 1.9% of those age 65 or over.

Arts and culture

Annual festivals
Sandy Springs offers a host of annual events each year.

The Sandy Springs Festival is the largest community event in Sandy Springs, with approximately 30,000 attendees. Established in 1984, the annual festival celebrated its 30th year in 2015. The festival features a juried artist's market, civic and business expo, performances by regional acts and community bands, a children's area with crafts and activities, a teen territory with bungee jumps and inflatables, the annual Kiwanis Pet Parade, the annual Doug Kessler Lighting 10K/5K race, and a food court. The festival serves as the primary fundraiser for Heritage Sandy Springs, a nonprofit dedicated to building community through preserving and promoting the historic and cultural identity of Sandy Springs. Heritage Sandy Springs also maintains Heritage Green, a  park in the heart of Sandy Springs. The most recent festival was held September 19–20, 2015. The autumnal festival is typically the third weekend in September, but has been cancelled since 2020 due to the worldwide Coronavirus pandemic.

Sandy Springs Artsapalooza is a free fine arts festival held each year in Sandy Springs. Each year 125 to 150 notable artists from across the country have the opportunity to participate. Organizers of the event include the Georgia Foundation for Public Spaces and ArtsSpring, two groups that are dedicated to bringing free arts programs to the community.

Stars and Stripes Celebration is an annual community fireworks display held over the July 4 holiday. The community previously gathered on the Concourse lawn for fireworks and live music, but in 2020 they moved the fireworks from the Concourse to City Springs.

The annual Chattahoochee River Summer Splash, held in July, is a  float along the Chattahoochee River, beginning at Morgan Falls Dam and finishing at Cochran Shoals-Powers Island National Recreation Area. After completing the float, participants can enjoy an afternoon of live music, food and fun during festivities at Powers Island. Guests can bring their own kayaks, canoes, or rafts, or rent them from several local outfitters. Morgan Falls Park is the hub for paddleboard and raft rentals in Sandy Springs.

Points of interest
The Heritage Sandy Springs Museum opened on March 20, 2010. It is dedicated to the history of the Sandy Springs community and is located in the repurposed Williams-Payne house at Heritage Green. Two notable exhibits are "Sandy Springs: Land and People", which tells the changing story of Sandy Springs as the home of Native Americans, rural farmers, and modern suburbanites; and "A Land Nearby", which features a collection of 20 photographs of Georgia's Barrier Island taken by Dr. Curt Hames Jr.

Sandy Springs also has a museum devoted to Anne Frank.

Parks

Abernathy Greenway: The city's newest park, 6.6-acre linear park opened in 2014. The playable art structures were created as part of an international competition developed by the Sandy Springs Conservancy and Art Sandy Springs and sponsored by Northside Hospital. 
Heritage Green: a  park at the center of Sandy Springs' new downtown development. It is the site of the original underground springs for which the city is named and is anchored by the Heritage Sandy Springs Museum. It is operated and managed by Heritage Sandy Springs, a 501(c)3 nonprofit organization dedicated to building community through preserving and promoting the historic and cultural identity of Sandy Springs. Heritage Sandy Springs presents a full calendar of public programs and events, including the Sandy Springs Festival, museum exhibits, lectures and programs, three concert series, children's educational and enrichment programming, and community gardening programs.
Hammond Park: multipurpose building, gym, game room, AstroTurf soccer field, lighted tennis courts, basketball courts, picnic pavilions, playground, restrooms
Morgan Falls Overlook: picnic pavilions, children's playground, boat dock/fishing pier, hiking trail, fire pit, porch swings, scenic views, restrooms
Morgan Falls Athletic Complex: baseball and softball fields, football fields, picnic pavilions, playgrounds, concessions stand, restrooms
Sandy Springs Tennis Center: clubhouse, pro shop, restrooms, locker rooms, lighted tennis courts, jogging trail
Abernathy Park: tennis courts, playground, picnic tables, arts center
Allen: playground, multipurpose court, walking trail, basketball court
John Ripley Forbes Big Trees Forest Nature: trails, tree, plant and wildlife sanctuary
Ridgeview: nature trails, picnic pavilion, playground
Windsor Meadows: benches and trails located at the intersection of Windsor Parkway and Northland Drive by Nancy Creek

Island Ford: home to the headquarters for the Chattahoochee National Recreation Area, this unit is located entirely within Sandy Springs. It is also home to the Hewlett Lodge, a former home dating back to 1941 that was acquired when the park service bought the land surrounding the home in 1979.

East Palisades: this park compromises the Fulton County portion of the Palisades unit.
Powers Island: this park is a part of the Cochran Shoals unit of the Chattahooche National Recreation Area.

Government

Officials
Mayor: Rusty Paul
District 1: John Paulson
District 2: Melody Kelley
District 3: Melissa Mular
District 4: Jody Reichel
District 5: Tiberio "Tibby" DeJulio
District 6: Andy Bauman
City Manager: Eden Freeman

Services
Sandy Springs was noted for contracting private companies to perform the majority of its services in a public-private partnership model of government at the beginning of its incorporation in 2005. While many governments contract with private-sector companies on a per-project basis, Sandy Springs is believed to be the first American city to outsource its services for the majority of ongoing operations. They chose to do so as an economic response to the Great Recession. The city regularly hosted delegations from other governments that were interested in the model. Services not outsourced include police, fire-rescue, and city management. The city moved away from the private-public partnership model in 2019 when it was realized how much money was lost to private contractors and hired 184 full-time city staff that work at the new City Springs development. It now operates as a hybrid model, outsourcing projects to private companies as needed. The city estimates $14 million will be saved over the next 5 years from hiring full-time staff.

The Sandy Springs Police Department (SSPD) is the city's police department and took over services from Fulton County on July 1, 2006, with 86 original police officers recruited from various police agencies from all over the State of Georgia.  The department currently has an authorized staff of 149 full-time sworn officers and 11 part-time officers. Additionally, SSPD also employs 23 civilian staff members who handle duties such as records, permits, GCIC, and fleet maintenance. The current Executive Officer is Chief Kenneth DeSimone, who assumed the position in 2013 from Terry Sult, who replaced Gene Wilson in 2008 as the Department's first Chief.  The department answered 124,374 Calls for Service and made 3,390 arrests in 2020.

Dedicated units of the SSPD include Uniform Patrol, Bike Unit, Community Affairs, Crime Scene Investigations, Criminal Investigation Division, Criminal Intelligence Unit, Crisis Negotiation Team, Honor Guard, K-9 Unit, Quick Response Force, Special Investigation Unit, Swift Water Rescue Team, Traffic Unit, and the Training Unit. Further, SSPD is a member of the North Metro SWAT Team, consisting of officers from Sandy Springs Police Department, Dunwoody Police Department, Johns Creek Police Department, and the Brookhaven Police Department.  The SSPD headquarters is located at 7840 Roswell Road, Suite 301, within the Morgan Falls Office Park.

The city's fire department began operations in December 2006. The department consists of 97 full-time firefighters. Chief Jack McElfish headed the fire department from 2005 - 2014. The fire department is today led by Chief Keith Sanders. It is staffed by 113 full-time firefighters. The fire department handled 17,000 responses to 8,205 calls for service

The city of Sandy Springs has purchased the old Target Corporation building (originally Richway) located on the corner of Sandy Springs Circle and Johnson Ferry Road. In May 2018, the new city hall opened after years of construction.

Education

Primary and secondary schools

Public schools are operated by the Fulton County School System. Elementary schools serving sections of Sandy Springs include Dunwoody Springs Charter Elementary School, Heards Ferry Elementary School, High Point Elementary School, Ison Springs Elementary School, Lake Forest Elementary School, Spalding Drive Charter Elementary School, and Woodland Charter Elementary School. Two middle schools, Sandy Springs Middle School and Ridgeview Charter Middle School, and two high schools, North Springs Charter School of Arts and Sciences and Riverwood High School, are in and serve Sandy Springs.

Private schools located in Sandy Springs include:
Brandon Hall School (5th grade through high school)
Springmont (formerly First Montessori School of Atlanta) (preschool through middle school)
Atlanta Jewish Academy (k–12)
Holy Innocents' Episcopal School (preschool through high school)
Mount Vernon Presbyterian School (preschool through high school)
St. Jude the Apostle Catholic School (k–8)
Opened September 4, 1962
The Alfred and Adele Davis Academy (k–8)
The Felicia Penzell Weber Jewish Community High School a.k.a. The Weber School (high school)
The Epstein School (k–8)
Holy Spirit Preparatory School Lower Campus (the upper campus and preschool are in Atlanta)
Cumberland Academy
The initial campus of Sophia Academy, which opened in 1999, was on a rental property, in what became Sandy Springs. Construction on its new campus on what later became Chamblee began circa 2007.

Public libraries
Atlanta-Fulton Public Library System operates the Sandy Springs Branch located near City Springs.

Economy
The largest employers within Sandy Springs are hospitals, headquarters and regional offices from a variety of industries including computer related services, package delivery, telecommunications, media, and financial transaction processing.

Sandy Springs is home to three hospitals: Northside Hospital, St. Joseph's Hospital and Children's Healthcare of Atlanta, comprising 40 percent of the hospital beds in the region.

Top employers
According to the city's 2021 Comprehensive Annual Financial Report, the top employers in the city are:

Media
Some notable newspapers that cover areas of interest to Sandy Springs include the Sandy Springs Reporter  and The Atlanta Journal-Constitution. Multiple television series are and have recorded within the city: Auction Kings at Gallery 63 on Roswell Road, Caffeine and Octane, and Say Yes to the Dress: Atlanta at Bridals by Lori on Hammond Drive. Other shows that have filmed in Sandy Springs include The Real Housewives of Atlanta, HBO's The Righteous Gemstones, the CW's Dynasty and the longest-running vampire television show The Vampire Diaries, which filmed scenes at the now torn-down Glenridge Hall and is portrayed as the main characters' home. It was also the film location of Driving Miss Daisy. The location of Glenridge Hall is now the home of the new North-American Headquarters for Mercedes-Benz and an additional townhouse development.

Infrastructure

Major roads and expressways
Sandy Springs is served by two major limited-access highways, Georgia 400 − which runs north–south − and I-285 − which runs east–west. Major surface streets include Roswell Road (U.S. 19 south of I-285 and Georgia 9 entirely), Hammond Drive, Spalding Drive, Johnson Ferry Road, Abernathy Road, Glenridge Drive, and Dunwoody Club Drive.

Roswell Road is considered the "main street" of the city, with a majority of residents living within 2 miles of the corridor. It connects Roswell at the Chattahoochee River to the north into the Atlanta neighborhood of Buckhead to the south. It runs through the heart of Downtown Sandy Springs, with the City Springs complex being located on the highway.

Recently completed major road projects include the widening of Abernathy Road between Johnson Ferry and Roswell Roads from two lanes to four plus a road median. The western intersection has been reconfigured so that traffic to and from Johnson Ferry Road − which carries heavy loads of Cobb County commuters across the Chattahoochee River at rush hour − now flows directly with Abernathy to and from the northwest. Additionally, the Roswell Road bridge over I-285 has been widened to add a turn lane in each direction. There had previously been talk of a tunnel under the freeway to bypass the highway interchange altogether, however this proved to be much too expensive. Another state project is the addition of a half-diamond interchange to Georgia 400 on the north side of Hammond Drive, allowing southbound traffic to exit and northbound traffic to enter the highway. (Ramps on the south side were not possible due to the proximity of the 400/285 interchange.)

The city's public works department has made improvements in the conditions of roads and traffic signals since incorporation in December 2005. The department has cleaned approximately 1,500 catch basins, striped  of roadway, responded to more than 2,000 calls for repair and service, re-timed hundreds of traffic lights to help improve the flow of traffic and reduce automobile idling, and repaved  of roads.

The 2008 fiscal year saw the creation of the Sandy Springs Traffic Management Center (TMC). The TMC was constructed and began to operate in less than six months. Construction began in February 2008, five cameras viewed traffic along Roswell Road by the end of June. Special features of the TMC include a webpage that allows the public access to real-time traffic conditions and voice-activated controls. By June 2009, 16 traffic cameras are now available and can be viewed online at the city's website.

Mass transit

The major provider of mass transit is MARTA, which operates a heavy rail rapid transit line and several bus lines through Sandy Springs. The city is served by the Medical Center, Sandy Springs and North Springs stations. The Georgia Regional Transportation Authority also operates express buses from the North Springs station (which has its own ramps to and from 400) to other counties.

Pedestrians and cycling
Currently the city is limited in multi-use trails, but bike lanes can be found in certain parts of the city. The city is currently working on creating more trails and bike lanes. Currently, the Abernathy Greenway is a popular multi-use trail running adjacent to Abernathy Road, connecting to Abernathy Park. The PATH400 Greenway Trail is a multi-use trail running along the Georgia 400 freeway in the Buckhead district of Atlanta. Sandy Springs is currently in the early stages of planning an extension of the trail through the city north into Roswell. Once complete, it would run from the northern border of Sandy Springs to the Atlanta BeltLine. As well, the city is working with the Georgia Department of Transportation to transform the city's portion of Roswell Road into a more pedestrian and transit friendly corridor. The city council came under fire in 2021 after two separate tragic hit-and-run accidents killed both a pedestrian and his dog and a cycler near downtown Sandy Springs.

Diplomatic missions
The city has three consulates general. The Consulate-General of Nigeria in Atlanta is located at 8060 Roswell Road. The Consulate-General of India is at 5549 Glenridge Drive.

References

Further reading
Maps of the former census-designated place:
  - Pages: 1, 2, 3, 4, and 5.
 The 1990 U.S. Census Map of Fulton County has Sandy Springs on pages 1, 2, 3, and 4.

External links

 City of Sandy Springs official website
 Sandy Springs Hospitality and Tourism
 Sandy Springs Chamber of Commerce
 Heritage Sandy Springs
 The City of Sandy Springs, Georgia historical marker
 The History of the City of Sandy Springs, Georgia historical marker
 The Sandy Springs historical marker
 Sandy Springs UMC Cemetery historical marker

 
Cities in Fulton County, Georgia
Former census-designated places in Georgia (U.S. state)
Cities in Georgia (U.S. state)
Populated places established in 2005
Cities in the Atlanta metropolitan area
Georgia populated places on the Chattahoochee River